Chen Wei-zen or Chen Wei-jen (born 24 May 1953), is a Taiwanese politician who was the Minister of the Interior from 2014 to 2016.

Education
Chen earned his bachelor's degree in urban planning from the National Cheng Kung University. He obtained his master's degrees in industrial planning from Chinese Culture University and in civil engineering from the University of Washington in the United States. He obtained his doctoral degree in planning and urban design from Chinese Culture University.

Early career
Upon graduation, Chen worked as Deputy Commissioner at the Department of Urban Development of Taipei City Government (TCG) in 1993–1995. In 1995–1997, he became the Deputy Commissioner at the Department of Construction of Taiwan Provincial Government followed by Commissioner and concurrently Deputy Secretary-General at the Information Department of the same office in 1997–1998. In 1998–2001, he became the Commissioner at the Department of Urban Development followed by Department of Public Works of TCG in 2001–2005.

Political career
In 2005–2009, he was appointed to be the Deputy Magistrate of Taipei County. In 2009–2010, he was the Administrative Deputy Minister of Transportation and Communications. In 2010–2013, he was the Deputy Mayor of Taipei City. In 2013–2014, he was the Secretary-General of Executive Yuan. In 2014, he was appointed to become the Minister of the Interior.

See also
 Executive Yuan

References

1953 births
Living people
Deputy mayors of Taipei
Taiwanese Ministers of the Interior